Tactel can mean:
Tactel (short for tactile element) - a single sensing point on a tactile sensor array
Tactel (fiber), a trademarked brand of synthetic fiber produced by Invista